Zarya is a rural locality (a settlement) in Uryvayevsky Selsoviet, Pankrushikhinsky District, Altai Krai, Russia. The population was 38 as of 2013. There is 1 street.

Geography 
Zarya is located 45 km west of Pankrushikha (the district's administrative centre) by road. Uryvayevo is the nearest rural locality.

References 

Rural localities in Pankrushikhinsky District